André Nelis (29 October 1935 – 9 December 2012) was a sailor and Olympian. He was born in Borgerhout, Belgium. He sailed in the Finn dinghy class, and won a silver medal at the 1956 Summer Olympics in Melbourne and bronze at the 1960 Summer Olympics in Rome. Competing in the Finn Gold Cup, Nelis won in 1956 and 1961; finished second in 1958, 1959, and 1960; and came third in 1957 and 1962.

References

External links
 
 
 

1935 births
2012 deaths
Belgian male sailors (sport)
World champions in sailing for Belgium
Finn class world champions
Olympic silver medalists for Belgium
Olympic bronze medalists for Belgium
Olympic medalists in sailing
Sailors at the 1956 Summer Olympics – Finn
Sailors at the 1960 Summer Olympics – Finn
Sailors at the 1964 Summer Olympics – Finn
Medalists at the 1960 Summer Olympics
People from Borgerhout
Sportspeople from Antwerp